Marcantonio Bobba (also in French Marc-Antoine Bobba) (died 1575) was an Italian Roman Catholic Bishop of Aosta, Italy and cardinal.

Biography
Marcantonio Bobba was born in Casale Monferrato, the son of Palatine Count Alberto Bobba. His family was related to the signori of Rosignano Monferrato.

He was educated at the University of Turin, becoming a doctor of both laws. There, he gained the favor of Emmanuel Philibert, Duke of Savoy, who made him a senator of Turin.

He was ordained as a priest around 1556. On 14 June 1557 he was elected to be Bishop of Aosta. He was consecrated as a bishop in Rome by Cardinal Giovanni Angelo de' Medici. The Duke of Savoy named him ambassador of the Duchy of Savoy to the Holy See in 1559. He arrived at the Council of Trent on 17 January 1563, participating in the Council until its close. He was also the Duchy of Savoy's ambassador to the Council. From 21 June 1563 he was a member of the Council's commission on canons and marriage.

Pope Pius IV made him a cardinal priest in the consistory of 12 March 1565. He participated in the papal conclave of 1565-66 that elected Pope Pius V. He received the red hat and the titular church of San Silvestro in Capite on 8 February 1566. Together with Cardinals Giovanni Ricci, Giovanni Francesco Commendone, and Alessandro Sforza, was named by Pope Pius V inspector of rivers, ports and public roads of Rome. He was a participant in the papal conclave of 1572 that elected Pope Gregory XIII. On 2 June 1572 he opted for the titular church of San Marcello al Corso.

He was a good friend of Cardinal Charles Borromeo.

He died in Rome on 18 March 1575. He was buried in Santa Maria degli Angeli e dei Martiri.

Episcopal succession

See also
Catholic Church in Italy

References

Bibliography
 

1575 deaths
16th-century Italian cardinals
Year of birth unknown
16th-century Italian Roman Catholic bishops
People from Casale Monferrato